Bartoletti is an Italian surname. Notable people with the surname include:

Bruno Bartoletti (1926–2013), Italian operatic conductor
Gabriele Bartoletti (born 1984), Italian footballer
Susan Campbell Bartoletti (born 1958), American writer

Italian-language surnames
Patronymic surnames
Surnames from given names